Khichdi: The Movie is a 2010 Indian comedy film, directed by Aatish Kapadia. It is the first film by Hats Off Productions and stars Anang Desai, Supriya Pathak, Rajeev Mehta, Nimisha Vakharia and Jamnadas Majethia in the lead roles. The film is based on the STAR India TV franchise Khichdi, which ran for three seasons titled Khichdi, Instant Khichdi and Khichdi Returns. It is the first film in the history of Hindi cinema to be based on a television series.

Plot

Two kids, Jacky and Chakki, narrate the story of their family in a summer camp.

The god of knowledge visits the Parekh family, consisting of the elder Babuji, his eldest son Praful, Praful's wife Hansa, Hansa's brother Himanshu, Praful's little brother's widowed wife Jayshree, Hansa and Praful's daughter Chakki, and Jayshree's son Jacky. The Parekhs drive the god crazy and he runs back to heaven.

The Parekhs are informed that Hansa and Himanshu's father is on his deathbed. Before dying he states that his last wish is to fulfill Himanshu's dream. Himanshu reveals that his dream is to have a legendary marriage. But after getting rejected by hundreds of brides, he falls in love with their neighbour's daughter Parminder Kaur. The two get engaged. On the day of the wedding, Himanshu realises that his marriage is not legendary, as it lacks thrill and adventure. The Parekhs stall the wedding and try to turn the Parminders against Himanshu so the two get broken up and then have a legendary reunion.

The Parekhs decide to rob Parminder's close friend Chakku Singh's house, but they discover that Chakku has been murdered and the police arrest Himanshu as the suspect. Parminder's father breaks the marriage but it is revealed that Parminder is marrying another groom tomorrow. During the court hearing, it is revealed that Chakku is alive and confesses that he committed suicide and Himanshu is released.

The Parekhs rush to Parminder's wedding. Parminder's father sees the news and happily accepts Himanshu as his son-in-law.

Cast
Anang Desai as Tulsidas Parekh a.k.a. Babuji: Tiwariben's son; Damyanti's widower; Praful, Bharat, Raju, Heera and Meera's father; Hansa, Jayshree, Bhavesh Kumar, Melissa's father-in-law; Jackky and Chakki's grandfather.
Rajeev Mehta as Praful Tulsidas Parekh: Tulsidas and Damyanti's elder son; Bharat, Raju, Heera and Meera's eldest brother; Hansa's husband; Jayshree, Bhavesh Kumar and Melissa's brother-in-law; Chakki's father.
Supriya Pathak as Hansa Praful Parekh(nee Seth): Chandrakant's daughter; Himanshu's elder sister; Praful's wife; Bharat, Raju , Heera , Meera, Jayshree, Bhavesh Kumar and Melissa's sister-in-law; Chakki's mother.
Jamnadas Majethia as Himanshu Chandrakant Seth: Chandrakant's son; Hansa's brother; Praful's brother- in-law; Chakki's uncle.
Nimisha Vakharia as Jayshree Parekh: Bharat's widow; Jackky's mother; Tulsidas's daughter-in-law; Praful, Raju , Heera, Meera, Hansa, Bhavesh Kumar, Melissa's sister in law.
Kirti Kulhari as Parminder “Pammi” Kaur / Laado Rani (Himanshu's love interest)
Gireesh Sahedev as Parminder Singh, Pammi’s brother 
Farah Khan as herself (cameo) – special appearance
Arvind Vaidya as Chandrakant "Chandu" Seth, Himanshu and Hansa's father
Dinyar Contractor as Judge
Satish Shah as Ishwar Buddhidev (cameo)
Deven Bhojani as hospital patient (cameo)
Paresh Ganatra as Advocate Pandit (cameo)
Kesar Majethia as Chakki Praful Parekh (narrator)
Markand Soni as Jackky Bharat Parekh (narrator)
Neel Patel as School Kid #1
Juhi Rangpariya as School Kid #2
Neil Jaysinghania as School Kid #3
 Anuj Gupta as Police Inspector
 Tina Parekh as Margaret “Maggie” D'Silva

Awards and nominations
6th Apsara Film & Television Producers Guild Awards

 Nominated:Apsara Award for Best Performance in a Comic Role — Jamnadas Majethia

2011 Zee Cine Awards
 Nominated:Zee Cine Award for Best Performance in a Comic Role — Jamnadas Majethia

2011 Filmfare Awards
 NominatedBest Actor In A Supporting Role – Female — Supriya Pathak

Sequel
A sequel to Khichdi: The Movie was planned. 

In 2023, the sequal to film started filming in February 2023. The entire cast was retained for the movie. Vandana Pathak from the original series stepped back in to movie replacing Nimisha Vakharia in the film. The film is scheduled to release in late 2023.

Cancelled Spin-off
A spin-off to the film was planned but later cancelled.

References

External links
 

2010 films
Films based on television series
2010 comedy films
Indian comedy films
2010s Hindi-language films
Fox Star Studios films
Hats Off Productions